Linderone is a bio-active isolate of Lindera lucida.

References

Dihydrochalcones